A parure is a set of various items of matching jewelry, which rose to popularity in early 19th-century Europe.

Terminology
A parure typically consists of a combination of a matching necklace, earrings, brooch, bracelet and often a diadem or tiara. A variation is the demiparure which consists of as few as two matching pieces, such as earrings and a necklace or brooch.

Design
A parure is not a static piece of jewelry but rather, is modular and can be reconfigured to remain fashionable and suit different occasions. Members of court and higher social ranks vied for the best jewelers to create the most imaginative and elaborate collections that would increase their status. Some necklaces could be worn intact or temporarily disassembled into bracelets, pendants, hair ornaments or brooches with interchangeable components and locking systems.

Cases for storing parures were also often highly decorative.

History
Artisans under Louis XIV were credited with some of the first parure inventions in the 18th century. Diamonds, often paired with silver, were popular at that time. A famous example was created for Mademoiselle d’Aubigné's wedding, which included: earrings, two pendants, loops and clasps for the sleeves, 32 buttons, and a large bowknot. There is a tendency for paste parures from the period to survive to the present,  as the low value of the component parts made them less likely to be broken up for reuse.

Napoleon Bonaparte was fond of lavishing these gem suites on his first wife, Joséphine, to wear at state functions. Later, he gave similar sets to his second wife, Marie-Louise, including a set made from cut steel.

From the mid-19th century, parures made up of hair jewellery or jet pieces were made as mourning wear.

Gallery

References

Jewellery
History of clothing (Western fashion)